An arris is an architectural structure.

Arris may also refer to:
 Arris, Batna, a town in Algeria
 Arris District, a district in Bosnia
 Arris International, a telecommunications company